A matrass (mod. Latin matracium) is a glass vessel with a round or oval body and a long narrow neck, used in chemistry as a digester or distiller. The Florence flask of commerce is frequently used for this purpose. The word is possibly identical with an old name matrass (Fr. materas, matelas) for the bolt or quarrel of a cross-bow. If so, some identity of shape is the reason for the application of the word; bolthead is also used as a name for the vessel. Another connection is suggested with the Arabic matra, a leather bottle.

References

See also
 Laboratory flask

External links
 

Laboratory equipment

es:Matraz
it:Matraccio